Ghanem Ahmad Ghanem Mohammad (born 29 September 1999) is an Emirati footballer who plays as a midfielder for Emirati club Al-Wasl.

Career
Ahmad started his career at Al-Wasl as a product of the club's youth system. On 13 March 2020, he made his professional debut against Hatta in the Pro League, replacing Waleed Al-Hammadi.

References

1999 births
Living people
Emirati footballers
Association football midfielders
Al-Wasl F.C. players
UAE Pro League players